Bonneval is a surname.  Notable people with the surname include:

 Eric Bonneval (born 1963), French rugby union player
 Hugo Bonneval (born 1990), French rugby union player, son of Eric

See also
 Claude Alexandre de Bonneval (1675–1747), French army officer